The year 2018 is the third year in the history of the ILFJ, a Japanese Lethwei promotion and the year started with Lethwei in Japan 7: Yuki. The events are streamed online by FITE TV, AbemaTV in Japan and through television agreements with MNTV in Myanmar.

List of events

Lethwei in Japan 7: Yuki 

Lethwei in Japan 7: Yuki was a Lethwei event held on February 21, 2018 at the Korakuen Hall in Tokyo, Japan.

Background 
For the main event, Myanmar rising star Tun Lwin Moe faced UFC, ROAD FC, Pancrase MMA veteran Shunichi Shimizu. Professional wrestler YABU and ZERO 1 athlete Chris Vice competed in the first 100kg bout of the promotion.

Results

Lethwei in Japan 8: Samurai 

Lethwei in Japan 8: Samurai was a Lethwei event held on June 29, 2018 at the Korakuen Hall in Tokyo, Japan.

Background 
This event marked the ILFJ debut of Myanmar Lethwei Champion Daiki Kaneko and the second fight of heavyweight Chris Vice in the organization. Japanese fighter Tokeshi Kohei defeated Lethwei veteran Saw Gaw Mu Do.

Results

Lethwei in Japan 9: Kodo 

Lethwei in Japan 9: Kodo was a Lethwei event held on September 13, 2018 at the Korakuen Hall in Tokyo, Japan.

Background 
Former UFC fighter Will Chope made his Lethwei debut against Lethwei veteran Shan Ko. Saw Min Aung vs. Tokeshi Kohei is a rematch from last years Air KBZ Aung Lan Championship that ended in a draw. The event was broadcast live on Japan’s AbemaTV and in Myanmar's MNTV.

Results

Lethwei in Japan 10: Nori 

Lethwei in Japan 10: Nori will be a Lethwei event held on November 14, 2018 at the Korakuen Hall in Tokyo, Japan.

Results

See also
2018 in K-1 
2018 in Kunlun Fight
2018 in World Lethwei Championship

References

International Lethwei Federation Japan events
2018 in Lethwei
2018 in kickboxing